Humboldt Unified School District is a school district based in Prescott Valley, Arizona, United States.

It includes most of Prescott Valley, all of Dewey Humboldt, small portions of Chino Valley and Mayer.

It has about 5,800 students, 10 schools, and 800 employees. The district's superintendent is  Mr. John Pothast.

It operates the following schools:
 Bradshaw Mountain High School
 Bradshaw Mountain Middle School
 Glassford Hill Middle School
 Coyote Springs Elementary School
 Granville Elementary School
 Humboldt Elementary School
 Lake Valley Elementary School
 Liberty K-8 Traditional School
 Mountain View Elementary School
 Bright Futures Preschool

References

External links
 

School districts in Yavapai County, Arizona
Prescott Valley, Arizona